USM Blida's 1951–52 season was the club's 18th season since its founding in 1932. The team competed in the Division Honneur, finishing 8th, and the Forconi Cup.

Pre-season and friendlies

Competitions

Overview

Division Honneur

League table

Matches

Forconi Cup

Squad statistics

Playing statistics

Goalscorers
Includes all competitive matches. The list is sorted alphabetically by surname when total goals are equal.

Transfers

In

Out

References

External links
 L'Echo d'Alger : journal républicain du matin

USM Blida seasons
Algerian football clubs 1950–51 season